Lóvua is an Angolan town and municipality, with a population of 13,033 (2014 census), located in the province of  Lunda Norte.

References 

Populated places in Lunda Norte Province
Municipalities of Angola